Forever Begins Tonight is the second album by Italian baritone Patrizio Buanne.  It was released on October 16, 2006 in the United Kingdom and on April 24, 2007 in the United States.

Like his first album, The Italian, Buanne's second album is composed of fresh arrangements of romantic Italian tunes sung in Italian, English, and Spanish.  It also presents some original songs written specifically for Buanne.  Additionally, the album includes an Italian version of Robbie Williams' song "Angels" (called "Un Angelo").

At its peak, Forever Begins Tonight ranked number seven on Billboard's "Top World Music Albums" chart.  In addition, it reached platinum status in Australia.

Track listing

Special editions
As with Buanne's previous album The Italian, several different versions of Forever Begins Tonight were released worldwide. The track listing only changed slightly. Some editions contained an all-English version of Always On My Mind, an Italian version of Let's Make Love or the Champions' Theme Stand Up (an altered version of the Pet Shop Boys version of Go West).

Charts

Certifications

References

2006 albums
Patrizio Buanne albums